Daniel Óscar Alanís García (born 2 March 1986 in Mexico City) is a Mexican football (soccer) player.

He currently plays as a forward for Club Universidad Nacional, a Mexico City team commonly known as the Pumas. He joined the Pumas youth system in 2005, coming from a Mexico City amateur club called Las Serpientes de Chinconcuac. Nicknamed "La Serpiente" (The Snake) in reference to his former team, he has yet to debut with the first team; this is something he hopes to achieve this season. He has been called to the Mexican U21 national team in the past.

References

External links
Profile at BDFA

1986 births
Living people
Club Universidad Nacional footballers
Footballers from Mexico City
Association football forwards
Mexican footballers